Waltzing Matilda is a 1933 Australian film directed by and starring Pat Hanna. It features Coral Browne.

Plot
Chic Williams and his friend James Brown wrongly believe they have injured a policeman in a drunken fight. Fleeing a private detective who is following them, they head for the bush.

Chic and James find work as drovers at Banjaroo Station, where his old army mate Joe works as an overseer. James falls in love with the station owner's daughter. The detective arrives and tells James he has inherited money. James and his girlfriend announce their engagement and Chic sets off alone as a swagman, accompanied by a chorus of 'Waltzing Matilda'.

Cast 
Pat Hanna as Chic Williams
Joe Valli as Joe McTavish
Frield Fisher as Albert
Coral Browne		
Norman French as James Brown	
Joan Lang	
Nellie Mortyne		
Dorothy Parnham as Dorothy Young
George Moon
Bill Innes

Production
Pat Hanna held a competition for the name of the film. A prize of £10 was shared amongst the 20 people who suggested "Waltzing Matilda".

The character of Chic William was well established on stage and in Pat Hanna's previous movies but changed for this film- he is poor, drinking heavily and drifting from job to job.

The movie was shot at Efftee Studios in Melbourne in mid 1933.

The romantic male lead, Norman French, was a casting director for Efftee and Hanna.

Reception

The film only ran for a short time in the cities but enjoyed more popularity in the country. Reviews were mixed. It was classified as a "middle grade" success at the box office.

Hanna was frustrated at the financial return he was getting for his efforts and this was his last film. However, in 1950 he said he was still making money by re-releasing his films.

References

External links 

Waltzing Matilda at Oz Movies

1933 films
Films directed by Raymond Longford
Australian black-and-white films
American comedy films
1933 comedy films
1930s English-language films
1930s American films